The Commission Internationale de Karting (CIK or CIK-FIA) is the primary international sanctioning body for kart racing. It was founded in 1962, and is headquartered in Paris, France. In 2000, it joined with the FIA. Its most important event is the Karting World Championship.

CIK's current president, former Formula One driver Felipe Massa, took office in December 2017. His predecessors were Luigi Macaluso (October 2005 – October 2009), Nicolas Deschaux (October 2009 – October 2010). and Shaikh Abdulla bin Isa Al Khalifa.

CIK-FIA kart racing categories 
 OK, the top level of karting
 KF2, a KF1 feeder series
 OKJ, an OK feeder series
 KZ1, the fastest KZ karting racing category
 KZ2, the second fastest KZ karting racing category

Notes

External links 

Kart racing organizations
Sports organizations established in 1962